Asini is a village and a former municipality in Argolis, Peloponnese, Greece, named after the ancient city of Asine. Since the 2011 local government reform it is part of the municipality Nafplio, of which it is a municipal unit. The municipal unit has an area of 136.873 km2. Population 5,340 (2011).

Notable people 
Theodorus of Asine (4th century BC), philosopher

See also 
 Asine

References

Populated places in Argolis